The Le Vaudreuil Golf Challenge is a golf tournament on the Challenge Tour, played at the Golf PGA France du Vaudreuil in Le Vaudreuil, France. It was played for the first time in July 2013.

Brinson Paolini won the inaugural tournament.

Winners

References

External links
Coverage on the Challenge Tour's official site

Challenge Tour events
Golf tournaments in France
Recurring sporting events established in 2013
2013 establishments in France